Lake Frome / Munda is a large endorheic lake in the Australian state of South Australia to the east of the Northern Flinders Ranges. It only rarely fills with brackish water flowing down usually dry creeks in the Northern Flinders Ranges from the west, or exceptional flows down the Strzelecki Creek from the north.

The Adnyamathanha name for the lake is Munda. Europeans named the lake Frome after Edward Charles Frome, after he mapped the area in 1843. The lake was officially dual named Lake Frome / Munda in 2004.

Description

The lake adjoins Vulkathunha-Gammon Ranges National Park to its west and lies adjacent to Lake Callabonna linked by Salt Creek to its north, the southern Strzelecki Desert to its east, and the Frome Downs pastoral lease to its south. The ancient Lake Mega-Frome (Lakes Frome, Blanche, Callabonna and Gregory) was last connected to Lake Eyre 50–47 thousand years ago.

The route to Lake Frome traverses flat, stony terrain following Balcanoona Creek through the only completely protected arid catchment in Australia. After crossing both the Moomba-Adelaide natural gas pipeline and the dingo fence the track passes over low sand dunes before arriving at the western shore of the lake. The protected area through which this access track travels is declared a Cultural Use zone for hunting by the local Adnyamathanha Aboriginal people between 3.00 pm and 5.00 am; during this period public access is prohibited.

Munda forms part of the local Dreaming story told by the Adnyamathanha people explaining how the region's geology and species originated. According to this Dreaming story, Munda was emptied of its water by the Rainbow Serpent Akurra when he ventured down Arkaroola Creek (which flows onto Munda) to drink. Due to its Dreamtime significance the Adnyamathanha do not venture onto the lake's surface.

Protected area status
Due to its "regional geological significance" the full extent of the lake was proclaimed as the Lake Frome Regional Reserve in 1991.

On 26  November 2021, the reserve's status was upgraded to a national park in recognition of its significance as a large salt lake, becoming Lake Frome National Park and giving it the same status as other large salt lakes such as Kati Thanda-Lake Eyre, Lake Torrens and Lake Gairdner.

See also
 List of lakes of South Australia

References 

Saline lakes of South Australia
Far North (South Australia)